Abu Tabareh may refer to:
 Abu Tabareh 1
 Abu Tabareh 2